Nottingham High School (also formally known as Hamilton High School North) is a four-year comprehensive public high school serving students in ninth through twelfth grades located in Hamilton Township, in Mercer County, New Jersey, United States, operating as one of the three secondary schools of the Hamilton Township School District; the other high schools in the district are Hamilton High School West and Steinert High School (Hamilton High School East).

As of the 2021–22 school year, the school had an enrollment of 985 students and 86.1 classroom teachers (on an FTE basis), for a student–teacher ratio of 11.4:1. There were 400 students (40.6% of enrollment) eligible for free lunch and 82 (8.3% of students) eligible for reduced-cost lunch.

Awards, recognition and rankings
Nottingham High School was the recipient of U.S. News & World Reports Bronze recognition for America's Best High Schools in both 2017 and 2018. Nottingham received an overall Niche grade of a B+ and was ranked as the seventh most diverse public high school in New Jersey.  This school was the 231st-ranked public high school in New Jersey out of 339 schools statewide in New Jersey Monthly magazine's September 2014 cover story on the state's "Top Public High Schools", using a new ranking methodology. The school had been ranked 276th in the state of 328 schools in 2012, after being ranked 264th in 2010 out of 322 schools listed. The magazine ranked the school 260th in 2008 out of 316 schools. The school was ranked 246th in the magazine's September 2006 issue, which surveyed 316 schools across the state.

Athletics
The Nottingham High School Northstars compete in the Colonial Valley Conference, which operates under the supervision of the New Jersey State Interscholastic Athletic Association. With 898 students in grades 10–12, the school was classified by the NJSIAA for the 2019–20 school year as Group III for most athletic competition purposes, which included schools with an enrollment of 761 to 1,058 students in that grade range. The football team competes in the Capitol Division of the 95-team West Jersey Football League superconference and was classified by the NJSIAA as Group III South for football for 2018–2020.

The school participates as the host school / lead agency for a joint ice hockey team with Hamilton High School West and Steinert High School. The co-op program operates under agreements scheduled to expire at the end of the 2023–24 school year.

Nottingham's wrestling team is referred as the "Swamprats." The Nottingham boys' swimming team had been to the NJSIAA state tournament for seven consecutive years from 2000 to 2006. The boys' baseball team won the 2008 Mercer County Tournament beating Notre Dame. The 2009 girls' spring track team was the first in Nottingham history to participate in the Penn Relays. The 2011 Nottingham boys track team was the first ever team in Nottingham history to go undefeated, winning the Mercer County Tournament and the Central Jersey Group III sectional championships.

The girls' softball team won the Group III state championship in 1987 (defeating runner-up West Morris Mendham High School in the tournament final) and 1990 (vs. Morris Hills High School). The 1987 team won the Group III title by a score of 2–1 against West Morris Mendham in the championship game. The 1990 team finished the season with a 24–3 record after a 6–4 victory against Morris Hills in the playoff finals.

Nottingham's 2012 football team won the Central Jersey Group III state championship game after defeating Neptune High School by a final score of 35–24 in a game played at The College of New Jersey. The team finished with a record of 11–1, earning the program's first state title and becoming the first Mercer County team since 1989 to win a football championship.

In 2018, the boys' basketball team defeated Chatham High School by a score of 60–53 in the tournament final at Rutgers University to win the school's first ever Group III state championship for basketball.

Courses
Nottingham offers Advanced Placement program (AP) courses in AP United States History, AP European History, AP Computer Science, AP Biology, AP Psychology, AP Chemistry, AP Environmental Science, AP French, AP Spanish, AP English Literature and Composition, and AP United States Government.

There is a FIRST Robotics Competition team available. (TEAM 2191)

Performances
The school has two core shows every year:

The annual Murder Mystery Dessert Theater and The Spring Musical.

Previous murder mysteries include "Offed at the Bake Off" (premiere workshop) - 2013, "Til Death Do Them Part" (premiere) - 2012, "An All You Can Murder Buffet" (premiere) - 2011, "Murderous Night at the Museum" (premiere) - 2010, and "A Family Reunion to Die For" (premiere) - 2009

Previous musicals include Damn Yankees (2011), High School Musical (2010) and Footloose (2009).

Administration
The school's principal is Frank Ragazzo. His core administration team includes three vice principals and the athletic director.

Notable alumni
 Saquan Hampton (born 1995, class of 2014), American football safety who played in the NFL for the New Orleans Saints.

Sister schools 
The two other high schools in the district (with 2021–22 enrollment data from the National Center for Education Statistics) are:
 Hamilton High School West (also known as Watson; 1,280 students)
 Steinert High School (East; 1,447)

References

External links
Nottingham High School
Hamilton Township Public Schools

Data for the Hamilton Township Public Schools, National Center for Education Statistics

Hamilton Township, Mercer County, New Jersey
Public high schools in Mercer County, New Jersey